Yixin may refer to: 
 Yixin, better known by his title Prince Gong, an imperial prince of the Aisin Gioro clan and an important statesman of the Manchu-led Qing dynasty in China
 Yixin, a computer software playing Gomoku and Renju.
 Yixin, Xinghua, a village in Xinghua Township, Hong'an County, Huanggang, Hubei, China